Michel Valke (born 24 August 1959) is a Dutch former footballer who played as a midfielder. Valke made his professional debut at Sparta Rotterdam and also played for PSV Eindhoven, Feyenoord Rotterdam, Olympique Lyonnais and Dordrecht'90. He was capped 16 times for the Netherlands.

Honours
PSV Eindhoven
 Eredivisie winner: 1985–86, 1986–87

References

External links
 Profile

1959 births
Living people
Dutch footballers
Feyenoord players
PSV Eindhoven players
Sparta Rotterdam players
Olympique Lyonnais players
FC Dordrecht players
Association football midfielders
Netherlands international footballers
Footballers from Zwijndrecht, Netherlands